Daniel Anthony Manion (born February 1, 1942) is an American lawyer, politician, and jurist serving as an inactive senior United States circuit judge of the United States Court of Appeals for the Seventh Circuit whose chambers were in South Bend, Indiana.

Early life and education
The elder son of Clarence and Virginia Manion, Daniel
Manion received his Bachelor of Arts degree from the University of Notre Dame in 1964. His father, Clarence Manion (1896–1979), was dean of Notre Dame Law School and president of the Manion Forum, a conservative radio and television program. His mother, Virginia ("Gina") O'Brien Manion, was a well-known owner and trainer of Arabian horses.

At Notre Dame, Manion was a three-time champion in the Bengal Bouts, a boxing tournament begun by legendary football coach Knute Rockne. Following graduation, Manion served in the United States Army during the Vietnam War, when he was deployed.

Career 
He was appointed the director of industrial development for the Indiana Department of Commerce in 1968. While serving in this position, Manion attended night school at Indiana University Robert H. McKinney School of Law, receiving his Juris Doctor in 1973. After a brief stint in the state attorney general's office, Manion entered the private practice of law, where he remained until his confirmation as a federal judge. He also served as an Indiana state senator from 1978 to 1982.

Federal judicial service 
On February 21, 1986, President Ronald Reagan nominated Manion to the United States Court of Appeals for the Seventh Circuit, to a seat vacated by Judge Wilbur Frank Pell Jr. In a radio address to the nation, President Reagan stated, "I know [Daniel Manion] to be a person who has the ability and determination to become the kind of judge the American people want in the federal courts; one who believes in the rule of law, who reveres the Constitution, and whose sense of fairness and justice is above reproach."

The ABA rated Manion "qualified/unqualified." Criticism of him as a nominee came for spelling and grammatical errors in legal briefs submitted to the Senate Judiciary Committee and for his support for the John Birch Society. He became the first of President Reagan's judicial nominees to fail to win support from the Judiciary Committee. The nomination was controversial; Manion was confirmed 48-46 on June 26, 1986 and reaffirmed 50-49 on July 23, 1986 with Vice President George Bush casting a tie-breaking vote. Manion received his commission on July 24, 1986. He assumed senior status on December 18, 2007, but continues to hear cases regularly.

Notable decisions 
  (ruling in favor of female paramedics who brought Title VII gender-discrimination lawsuit against the City of Chicago)
  (Manion, J., dissenting) (applying strict scrutiny to local ordinance prohibiting possession of semi-automatic rifles)
  (Manion, J., dissenting) (concluding that anti-panhandling ordinance prohibiting "immediate requests for monetary donations" was content-based and subject to strict scrutiny)
  (Manion, J., concurring in part and dissenting in part) (concluding that Indiana high school boys basketball coach's short haircut policy did not violate the Equal Protection Clause)
  (Manion, J., concurring in part and in the judgment) (concluding that the rational basis standard of review applied in challenge to Wisconsin law requiring that abortion doctors possess admitting privileges at hospitals within 30 miles from where they perform abortions)
  (Manion, J., concurring in part and dissenting in part) (disagreeing that Bivens remedy was available for alleged torture of detainees by American military personnel in war zone in the absence of Congressional authorization and expressing "serious reservations" about the majority's holding that Secretary Rumsfeld may be held personally liable for the alleged actions of his subordinates under the plaintiffs' allegation)
  (upholding Illinois "moment of silence" law)
  (Manion, J., concurring in part and dissenting in part) (disagreeing that application of Lemon test compelled removal of Ten Commandments from near City Hall)
 Planned Parenthood of Indiana and Kentucky v. Commissioner of the Indiana State Department of Health (Manion, J., dissenting); noted for its connection to a dissent on abortion and eugenics which Judge Amy Coney Barrett joined, and for Senator Patrick Leahy's question on the case to Barrett during her Supreme Court confirmation hearings in October, 2020.

Notable former law clerks 

 Michael B. Brennan, circuit judge, United States Court of Appeals for the Seventh Circuit
 Steve Dillard, chief judge, Court of Appeals of Georgia
 Len Munsil, former candidate for governor of Arizona
 Joseph L. Toth, judge, United States Court of Appeals for Veterans Claims
 Patrick J. Urda, judge, United States Tax Court
 Tammy McCutchen, administrator of the Wage and Hour Division

Personal life
Manion is married to Ann Murphy Manion, a member of the second class of women to gain entrance to the University of Notre Dame, who graduated magna cum laude in 1977. The couple has four children.

Manion's younger brother, Christopher Manion (born 1946), was a member of the Foreign Relations Committee staff chosen by Senator Jesse Helms (R-NC) in the early 1980s. In 1986, one month after his brother's judicial confirmation, he was mentioned in an FBI investigation regarding a purported release of classified information to Chilean officials "about a covert American intelligence-gathering operation". Helms and Manion were exonerated after the investigation.

Before his Senate service, Christopher Manion earned his Ph.D in government at Notre Dame University. He served as assistant to the director of Rockford College in Illinois. He later taught politics, religion, and international relations at Boston University, Catholic University of America, and Christendom College. He is a Knight of Malta.

In the 1990s, he was director of legislation at the American Council for Health Care Reform, which opposed President Clinton's health reform plans.

References

External links
 

1942 births
Living people
20th-century American judges
Culver Academies alumni
Republican Party Indiana state senators
Indiana University Robert H. McKinney School of Law alumni
Judges of the United States Court of Appeals for the Seventh Circuit
People from South Bend, Indiana
United States court of appeals judges appointed by Ronald Reagan
University of Notre Dame alumni